The Green River Crib Dam is a historic 19th-century dam on the Green River in western Guilford, Vermont.  Built about 1811, it is a reminder of the modest industrial enterprises once conducted in the area using the water power it provided, and is one of the state's few surviving crib dams.  It was listed on the National Register of Historic Places in 1995.

Description and history
The dam is located in far western Guilford, upstream of the Green River Covered Bridge, which spans the Green River at the junction of Green River Road with Jacksonville Stage Road. The material of the dam mostly logs and rubble, with plank facing. The abutments of the dam are now a combination of stone and concrete, the wing wall on the east side extending downstream toward the bridge, where it formed part of the foundation of a now-destroyed mill.

The earliest recorded documentation of a dam on this site dates to 1811, when Jonah Cutting is known to have a paper and linseed oil mill operating at the site.  Some of the materials of the present dam may well date to this period.  By 1856 the mill is only documented as being used for paper production.  In 1869 a major flood apparently damaged the mill beyond repair, and it may also have damaged the dam; it washed out the bridge then standing just downstream.  In 1871 Henry Stowe erected a lumber and grist mill on the site, which operated until 1918, when it was destroyed by fire.  The dam has since then been maintained by private owners, forming a picturesque part of the small Green River village and a reminder of its modest industrial past.

See also
National Register of Historic Places listings in Windham County, Vermont

References

External links
 Green River Village Preservation Trust

Dams on the National Register of Historic Places in Vermont
Infrastructure completed in 1811
Buildings and structures in Guilford, Vermont
Dams in Vermont
National Register of Historic Places in Windham County, Vermont
1811 establishments in Vermont